Plate spinning is a circus manipulation art where a person spins plates, bowls and other flat objects on poles, without them falling off. Plate spinning relies on the gyroscopic effect, in the same way a top stays upright while spinning. Spinning plates are sometimes gimmicked, to help keep the plates on the poles.

History

Plate spinning has existed since at least the 3rd century. It is likely it originated in China but it also has a long history in Western countries from evidence in medieval religious manuscripts. The first book providing instruction for plate spinning was published in 1901.

Types of plate spinning

Plate spinning has a variety of related skills and performances. The most recognised is the spinning of a plate horizontally on top of a stick. Plates can, however, be spun on their edge, as in 'Plate waltzing' or spun vertically as in 'Plate juggling'. Plate spinning skills can also be performed with other circus skills such as acrobatics and other juggling or balance skills.

Horizontal plate spinning 

This type is the most recognised form of plate spinning and is performed widely using various types of sticks and plates. The plate is spun horizontally on the tip of a stick which is often 'sharpened' in some way. The plate's motion can be maintained by moving the tip of the stick in a circular fashion.

Rack or table plate spinning 

In this type of plate spinning the sticks are inserted in a rack, frame or hole in a table. Using this, the performer can spin multiple plates on multiple sticks

Dynamic plate spinning 

This type of plate spinning involves not only spinning the plate or plates with hand held sticks but includes tricks such as: throwing and catching the plate on the stick, manipulating the stick and plate combination around the arms, legs and body and performing acrobatics while still spinning the plates. Another specialist form is the combination of plate manipulation and a mouth stick

Acrobatic plate spinning 

Many Chinese acrobatics troupes feature plate spinning, usually in combination with contortion or acrobatic skills. These usually feature performers holding several plates in each hand spinning on sticks.

Plate waltzing 

Plate waltzing is where plates are spun on their edges on a table top or similar surface.

Plate juggling 

Plate juggling is similar to ring juggling, a form of Toss juggling. The plates are thrown and caught vertically. A few performers can also juggle multiple plates from two sticks while the plates are spinning horizontally.

Plate spinning and other skills

Plate spinning is also incorporated into other forms of performance arts such as dancing.

Types of spinning plate
Spinning plates (and other spinning props that are similar) have been made from a variety of materials. The first spinning plates were wooden and china but since the advent of new manufacturing techniques plates have been made of brass, steel, aluminium and plastic. The first plastic plate was produced by the Whirley Corporation in the USA in 1958. Other manufacturers produced similar products and spinning plates are now produced in many countries.

In popular culture

The tune "Sabre Dance" is often played in the background. Erich Brenn performed on the American television program The Ed Sullivan Show and other American variety and talent shows during the early years of American television. Tom Griswold, co-host of The Bob & Tom Show, a syndicated American comedy radio program, occasionally says he wishes he could see a plate spinner on TV again and wants to book one for his staff's annual Christmas party, which Chick McGee cites as further evidence that Griswold is out of touch with contemporary entertainment. In an episode of the Simpsons, at the Springfield Retirement Castle talent show, one participant does a similar act, but uses the dentures of several of the residents.  Plate spinning was often seen in HBO's prison drama Oz, where an unnamed prisoner would often be seen spinning a book on the tip of a pen.

The popular British game show The Generation Game would regularly feature a plate spinner demonstrating his skills, then inviting the contestants to attempt it. During the 1960s & 1970s German Performer Wolfgang Bartschelly popularised plate spinning and regularly appeared on television.

Records
 The most peoples spinning plates at the same time is 1026 people at an event opening Sportcampus in Utrecht, Netherlands on 25th September 2007.
 The Guinness World Record for spinning multiple plates is held by David Spathaky assisted by Debbie Woolley, who spun 108 plates simultaneously on a television show in Bangkok, Thailand in 1996.

Notable plate spinners
 Andrew Van Buren - British plate spinner and juggler.
 David Spathaky - world record British plate spinner formerly of Ra-Ra Zoo
 Erich Brenn - American plate spinner 
 Angel Bojilov Jr 
 Kumar Pallana 
 Masayuki Furuya - Japanese modern Plate spinniner.

References

External links

 Learn to spin and juggle plates
 Financial Times Masterclass Plate Spinning with plate spinner Andrew Van Buren
 The Generation Game with Mel & Sue
 BBC Generation Game Jim Davidson on Mel & Sue health and Safety of Plate Spinning
 Wolfgang Bartchelly
 World record plate spinning

Circus skills